Firmin Abissi (born 25 September 1951) is a Beninese boxer who competed in the 1980 Summer Olympics in Moscow and the 1984 Summer Olympics in Los Angeles. During the 1980 games, he was eliminated in the second round of the men's bantamweight division by Ryszard Czerwiński of Poland. During the 1984 games, Abissi was eliminated in the second round of the men's bantamweight division by Barbar Ali Khan of Pakistan.

Abissi carried the flag for Benin during the opening ceremony for the 1984 Summer Olympics.

References

1951 births
Bantamweight boxers
Beninese male boxers
Boxers at the 1980 Summer Olympics
Boxers at the 1984 Summer Olympics
Living people
Olympic boxers of Benin